Radu Sîrbu (also known as Radu Sârbu, RadU, Picasso and Radu Alexeevici Sîrbu (born 14 December 1978 in Peresecina) is a Moldovan singer and music producer. He was part of the pop music trio O-Zone whom received international success for their single Dragostea Din Tei. He currently lives and works in Bucharest, Romania.

Biography

Radu Sîrbu was born on 14 December 1978 in Peresecina village and lived there during his early childhood. For a portion of his youth, he lived in the cities of Orhei and Bălți. He would later return to Peresecina to finish high school and work as a DJ at his father's nightclub. He also organized musical theatre shows through his studio, "Artshow," which he created for children and teenagers. In 1996, after graduating, he began his studies at the Chișinău Music Conservatory and taught vocal classes for children on the side.

In 2001, Sîrbu was selected to be a member of O-Zone during a casting session organized by the Moldavian singer Dan Balan. The group was then made up of three members: Sîrbu, Balan, and Arsenie Todiras (nicknamed Arsenium). The group quickly gained popularity in Moldova. They moved to Bucharest in 2002 to expand their notoriety further.

The band's first successful song was 'Despre Tine' ('About You') which topped the charts in Romania. Their second hit, 'Dragostea Din Tei' ('Love from the Linden Trees') brought O-Zone international fame. After spending four weeks at the top of the Romanian Top 100, the Italian label Time Records offered them a one-year contract. After its release in Italy at the beginning of 2004, the song became a hit across Europe and topped the Eurochart Hot 100 for twelve weeks. Dragostea Din Tei reached the first position in the French, German, Belgian, Swiss, and Dutch charts at the end of 2004.

In January 2005, the trio announced that O-Zone would be disbanded and that they had planned to focus on their respective solo careers. Balan would move to The United States with his rock band 'Balan' while Todiras launched a solo career in Germany under the name Arsenium. Sîrbu would also work on solo projects. In 2005, he worked with DJ Mahay and released the song 'Dulce'. He made a music video for the song 'Whap-pa' and released his album titled Alone. More recently he released his single Doi străini (Two strangers) alongside a music video. In 2007, he and Arsenium got together and released the single July. He changed his stage name to RadU and currently lives in Romania with his wife and daughter.

His work as a producer
After releasing his first album under Mr&Ms, Sîrbu began to work with DJ Layla. They produced the song 'Single Lady' by DJ Layla featuring. Alissa. The lyrics were co-written by Radu and Sianna Sîrbu. The video for 'Single Lady' was released; and the track reached No.1 in Europa Plus Moscow/Russia. Sîrbu also released a second single with DJ Layla, 'City Of Sleeping Hearts' and released a music video for it. 

He then started producing under the brand Wild Rose Project. The first single of the project named 'Ecstasy' was in collaboration with the artist Dee-Dee. In 2014, Radu produced the song 'Dynamite', sung by Liza Fox with lyrics co-written by Radu Sîrbu, Anna Sîrbu, and Inessa Lee. The song reached the top 40 charts in the United Kingdom.

Albums

Alone
 "Whappa" - 3:26
 "Perfect Body" - 3:16
 "Tu nu" - 3:30
 "Ya Proshu" - 4:23
 "Zâmbeşti cu mine (feat. Anastasia-Dalia)" - 3:29
 "Fly" - 3:58
 "Sună Seara" - 3:22
 "Leave me Alone" - (4.30)
 "Whap-pa (English version)" - 3:29
 "Whap-pa (RMX Radu)" - 3:35
 "Doi Străini" 3:51

Heartbeat
 "Heartbeat"
 "Love is not a reason to cry"
 "Stop hating me"
 "Doare"
 "Don't be afraid"
 "Nu uita"
 "She is the best song I ever wrote"
 "Iubirea ca un drog"
 "Daun-Daha (save my life)"
 "It's too late"
 "Monalisa"
 "Love is not a reason to cry-club remix"
 "Love is not a reason to cry-radio remix"

Singles 
 "Mix Dojdi" (1995)
 "Dulce" (featuring DJ Mahay) (2005)
 "Whap-Pa" (2006)
 "Doi Străini" (2006)
 "July" (featuring Arsenium) (2007)
 "Iubirea ca un drog" (2007)
 "Daun Daha" (2007)
 "Love Is Not A Reason To Cry" (March 2008) (MR & MS)
 "In One" (2008) (MR & MS)
 "Single Lady" (2009) (Dj Layla)
 "City Of Sleeping Hearts" (2010) (DJ Layla)
 "Emotion" (2011) (Sianna)
 "Broken Heart" (feat. Sianna), 2012 
 "Rain Falling Down" (feat. Sianna), 2013
 "Dynamite" (2014) (Liza Fox)
Esti Doar O (2017)
 "Lay Down" (feat. Arsenium) (2020)

References

External links

 Official Site

1978 births
Living people
English-language singers from Moldova
Moldovan expatriates in Romania
People from Orhei District
O-Zone members
Moldovan record producers
21st-century Moldovan male singers